29 km is a rural locality (a settlement) in Dobryansky District, Perm Krai, Russia. The population was 2 as of 2010. There is one street.

References 

Rural localities in Dobryansky District